Zuzana Klimešová (born 21 January 1979) is a Czech former basketball player who competed in the 2004 Summer Olympics and played in the Women's National Basketball Association for the Indiana Fever. She played college basketball in the United States at Vanderbilt University.

Vanderbilt statistics

Source

References 

1979 births
Living people
Basketball players at the 2004 Summer Olympics
Czech expatriate basketball people in the United States
Czech women's basketball players
Indiana Fever players
Olympic basketball players of the Czech Republic
Sportspeople from Prague
Vanderbilt Commodores women's basketball players